William Holden (born 1860) was an English footballer who played in The Football League for Blackburn Rovers.

1888-1889
In late December 1888 Blackburn Rovers had a goalkeeping crisis so Rovers approached Darwen and borrowed William Holden. His only League game could not have been more difficult. He was in goal on 29 December 1888 as Rovers travelled to Deepdale, home of "The Invincibles", Preston North End. Holden played really well as reported by the journalists of the day and had a clean sheet at half-time. In the end, in a tight game Preston were the  more dangerous team and their star forward, John Goodall got the only goal of the game. Holden returned to Darwen early in the New Year, 1889.

References

1860 births
English footballers
Blackburn Rovers F.C. players
Darwen F.C. players
English Football League players
Year of death missing
Association football goalkeepers